Custóias, Leça do Balio e Guifões is a civil parish in the municipality of Matosinhos, Portugal. It was formed in 2013 by the merger of the former parishes Custóias, Leça do Balio and Guifões. The population in 2011 was 45,716, in an area of 18.84 km².

References

Freguesias of Matosinhos